Standardized Kt/V, also std Kt/V, is a way of measuring (renal) dialysis adequacy.  It was developed by Frank Gotch and is used in the United States to measure dialysis.  Despite the name, it is quite different from Kt/V.  In theory, both peritoneal dialysis and hemodialysis can be quantified with std Kt/V.

Derivation
Standardized Kt/V is motivated by the steady state solution of the mass transfer equation often used to approximate kidney function (equation 1), which is also used to define clearance.

where
 is the mass generation rate of the substance - assumed to be a constant, i.e. not a function of time (equal to zero for foreign substances/drugs) [mmol/min] or [mol/s]
t is dialysis time [min] or [s]
V is the volume of distribution (total body water) [L] or [m3]
K is the clearance [mL/min] or [m3/s]
C is the concentration [mmol/L] or [mol/m3] (in the United States often [mg/mL])
From the above definitions it follows that  is the first derivative of concentration with respect to time, i.e. the change in concentration with time.

Derivation equation 1 is described in the article clearance (medicine).

The solution of the above differential equation (equation 1) is

where
Co is the concentration at the beginning of dialysis [mmol/L] or [mol/m3]
e is the base of the natural logarithm

The steady state solution is

This can be written as

Equation 3b is the equation that defines clearance.  It is the motivation for K' (the equivalent clearance):

where
K' is the equivalent clearance [mL/min] or [m3/s]
 is the mass generation rate of the substance - assumed to be a constant, i.e. not a function of time [mmol/min] or [mol/s]
Co is the concentration at the beginning of dialysis [mmol/L] or [mol/m3]

Equation 4 is normalized by the volume of distribution to form equation 5:

Equation 5 is multiplied by an arbitrary constant to form equation 6:

Equation 6 is then defined as standardized Kt/V (std Kt/V):

where

 const is 7×24×60×60 seconds, the number of seconds in a week.

Interpretation of std Kt/V
Standardized Kt/V can be interpreted as a concentration normalized by the mass generation per unit volume of body water.

Equation 7 can be written in the following way:

If one takes the inverse of Equation 8 it can be observed that the inverse of std Kt/V is proportional to the concentration of urea (in the body) divided by the production of urea per time per unit volume of body water.

Comparison to Kt/V
Kt/V and standardized Kt/V are not the same. Kt/V is a ratio of the pre- and post-dialysis urea concentrations. Standardized Kt/V is an equivalent clearance defined by the initial urea concentration (compare equation 8 and equation 10).

Kt/V is defined as (see article on Kt/V for derivation):

Since Kt/V and std Kt/V are defined differently, Kt/V and std Kt/V values cannot be compared.

Advantages of std Kt/V
 Can be used to compare any dialysis schedule (i.e. nocturnal home hemodialysis vs. daily hemodialysis vs. conventional hemodialysis)
 Applicable to peritoneal dialysis.
 Can be applied to patients with residual renal function; it is possible to demonstrate that Co is a function of the residual kidney function and the "cleaning" provided by dialysis.
 The model can be applied to substances other than urea, if the clearance, K, and generation rate of the substance, are known.

Criticism/disadvantages of std Kt/V
 It is complex and tedious to calculate, although web-based calculators are available to do this fairly easily.
 Many nephrologists have difficulty understanding it.
 Urea is not associated with toxicity.
 Standardized Kt/V only models the clearance of urea and thus implicitly assumes the clearance of urea is comparable to other toxins.  It ignores molecules that (relative to urea) have diffusion-limited transport - so called middle molecules.
 It ignores the mass transfer between body compartments and across the plasma membrane (i.e. intracellular to extracellular transport), which has been shown to be important for the clearance of molecules such as phosphate.
 The Standardized Kt/V is based on body water volume (V).  The Glomerular filtration rate, an estimate of normal kidney function, is usually normalized to body surface area (S).  S and V differ markedly between small vs. large people and between men and women.  A man and a woman of the same S will have similar levels of GFR, but their values for V may differ by 15-20%.  Because standardized Kt/V incorporates residual renal function into the calculations, it makes the assumption that kidney function should scale by V.  This may disadvantage women and smaller patients of either sex, in whom V is decreased to a greater extent than S.

Calculating stdKt/V from treatment Kt/V and number of sessions per week

The various ways of computing standardized Kt/V by Gotch, Leypoldt, and the FHN trial network  are all a bit different, as assumptions differ on equal spacing of treatments, use of a fixed or variable volume model, and whether or not urea rebound is taken into effect.  One equation, proposed by Leypoldt and modified by Depner that is cited in the KDOQI 2006 Hemodialysis Adequacy Guidelines and which is the basis for a web calculator for stdKt/V is as follows:

where stdKt/V is the standardized Kt/V 
spKt/V is the single-pool Kt/V, computed as described in Kt/V section using a simplified equation or ideally, using urea modeling, and 
eKt/V is the equilibrated Kt/V, computed from the single-pool Kt/V (spKt/V) and session length (t) using, for example, the Tattersall equation:

where t is session duration in minutes, and C is a time constant, which is specific for type of access and type solute being removed.  For urea, C should be 35 minutes for arterial access and 22 min for a venous access.

The regular "rate equation"  also can be used to determine equilibrated Kt/V from the spKt/V, as long as session length is 120 min or longer.

Plot showing std Kt/V depending on regular Kt/V for different treatment regimens 

One can create a plot to relate the three grouping (standardized Kt/V, Kt/V, treatment frequency per week), sufficient to define a dialysis schedule. The equations are strongly dependent on session length; the numbers will change substantially between two sessions given at the same schedule, but with different session lengths.

For the present plot, a session length of 0.4 Kt/V units per hour was assumed, with a minimum dialysis session length of 2.0 hours.

References

External links
 Standardized Kt/V , HDP(HemoDialysis Product calculation - hdtool.net
 Standardized Kt/V using formal 2-pool kinetics - Ureakinetics.org
 Standardized Kt/V calculator - HDCN

Renal dialysis